Late endosomal/lysosomal adaptor, MAPK and MTOR activator 1 is a protein that in humans is encoded by the LAMTOR1 gene.

References

Further reading